Coleman Hargrove Van de Graaff (September 7, 1893 – January 2, 1938) was a college football player. He was an advocate for an airport in Tuscaloosa.

Early years
Hargrove was born on September 7, 1893 in Tuscaloosa, Alabama  to Circuit Judge Adrian Sebastain Van de Graaff Sr. and Minnie Cherokee Jemison Van de Graaff.

He helped organize sports at Tuscaloosa High School with football, baseball, and track.

College athletics
Hargrove was an All-Southern end for the Alabama Crimson Tide of the University of Alabama. His brothers Adrian and William also played for Alabama. William, known as "Bully," was Alabama's first All-American. Hargrove was the smallest of the three. Hargrove also played baseball and lettered in track.  Robert J. Van de Graaff, the inventor of the Van de Graaff generator which produces high voltages, was another brother.

Following a hard-fought scoreless tie with Georgia Tech in 1911, coach John Heisman declared that he had never seen a player "so thoroughly imbued with the true spirit of football as Hargrove Van de Graaff." In a game in 1913 against Tennessee, Hargrove nearly lost an ear and tried to rip it off to avoid leaving the game.

Military
After graduation, Hargrove followed Adrian into the military. He served in Mexico and in France in the First World War. Hargrove came back with the Croix de Guerre.

References

External links
 

1893 births
1938 deaths
American football ends
Alabama Crimson Tide football players
All-Southern college football players
American military personnel of World War I
Sportspeople from Tuscaloosa, Alabama
Players of American football from Alabama
American people of Dutch descent